Golbolaghi (also Romanized as Golbolāghī) is a village in Bughda Kandi Rural District, in the Central District of Zanjan County, Zanjan Province, Iran. At the 2006 census, its population was 626, in 163 families.

References 

Populated places in Zanjan County